Svechinsky District is an administrative and municipal district (raion), one of the thirty-nine in Kirov Oblast, Russia. It is located in the west of the oblast. Its administrative center is the urban locality (an urban-type settlement) of Svecha. Population:  10,229 (2002 Census);  The population of Svecha accounts for 55.9% of the district's total population.

References

Notes

Sources

Districts of Kirov Oblast